This is a list of Spanish football transfers for the summer sale in the 2012–13 season of La Liga and Segunda División. Only moves from La Liga and Segunda División are listed.

The summer transfer window opened on 1 July 2012, and closed at midnight on 31 August 2012.

Summer 2012 La Liga transfer window

See also
List of Spanish football transfers winter 2012–13

References

Spanish
2012
2012
Trans
2012